is a Japanese manga artist known for her works of Gakuen Alice and Portrait of M and N.

In year 1996, she first made her professional debut in Bessatsu Hana to Yume 5th issue, entitled .

With an interview with Tokyopop she gave a detailed look on how she started as a manga artist:

Her current completed work is Gakuen Alice.

Works
 Swan Lake (1999, Hakusensha)
 Portrait of M and N (2000–2002, serialized in Hana to Yume, Hakusensha)
  (2003-2013, serialized in Hana to Yume, Hakusensha)
 Kageki No Kuni No Alice (Alice in the Country of the Opera) (2016-2017, Hana To Yume) (3 volumes)
  (2014, Hakusensha)
  (2014, to be serialized in Hana to Yume, Hakusensha)(3 volumes)
The Witch of Champignon(2019-ongoing , Manga Park )-4 volumes already published (as of August 2022)

References

External links
  

1976 births
Living people
People from Kyoto
Women manga artists
Manga artists from Kyoto Prefecture
Japanese female comics artists
Female comics writers
Japanese women writers